Malcolm David "Red" Fleming (October 27, 1889 – December 18, 1933) was an American college football player and coach. Fleming attended Washington & Jefferson College in Washington, Pennsylvania, where he played football as a halfback from 1912 to 1914 for head coach Bob Folwell. Fleming was the 15th head football coach at the Virginia Military Institute (VMI) in Lexington, Virginia, serving the 1919 season and compiling a record of 6–2. 

Fleming served in the United States Marine Corps during World War I and coached the football team at Marine Corps Base Quantico in 1917. He returned to Washington & Jefferson in 1920 and spent one season as assistant coach under head football coach David C. Morrow. Fleming died of a heart attack on December 18, 1933, at his sister's home in Altoona, Pennsylvania.

Head coaching record

College

References

External links
 

1889 births
1933 deaths
American football halfbacks
VMI Keydets football coaches
Washington & Jefferson Presidents football coaches
Washington & Jefferson Presidents football players
United States Marine Corps personnel of World War I
People from Blair County, Pennsylvania
Players of American football from Pennsylvania
Coaches of American football from Pennsylvania